Kelvin Graham (born 27 April 1964) is an Australian sprint canoeist who competed in the late 1980s and early 1990s. Competing in two Summer Olympics, he won two bronze medals with one in 1988 in K-2 1000 m and the second in 1992 in K-4 1000 m.

References
Sports-reference.com profile

1964 births
Australian male canoeists
Canoeists at the 1988 Summer Olympics
Canoeists at the 1992 Summer Olympics
Living people
Olympic canoeists of Australia
Olympic bronze medalists for Australia
Olympic medalists in canoeing
Medalists at the 1992 Summer Olympics
Medalists at the 1988 Summer Olympics
20th-century Australian people